Timmapuram Karanam Ravi Prakash Rao, popularly known as Tirupathi Prakash, is a well known comedy artist in Telugu cinema. He was born in Hindupur in the Anantapuram district on 22 August 1972 to TK Rama Murthy Rao and T K Satyavathi.

Tirupathi Prakash started his career in the TV and film industry as comedy artist and supporting artist. 
He has acted in more than five tele serials including Sangharshana for ETV Telugu, Viyyankulu for ETV, Mr. Romeo for Zee Telugu and Sambarala Rambabu for Maa TV.

He has acted in more than 180 Telugu movies.

Filmography

 Jamba Lakidi Pamba (1993)
 Varasudu (1993)
 Abbaigaru (1993)
 Alibaba Aradajanu Dongalu (1994)
 Aame (1994)
 Suswagatham (1997)
 Hitler (1997)
 Master (1997)
 Pavitra Prema (1998)
Ammo! Okato Tareekhu (2000)
 Neetho Cheppalani (2002)
 Nijam (2003)
 Gudumba Shankar (2004)
 Shankar Dada MBBS (2004)
 Maayajaalam (2006)
 Alasyam Amrutham (2010)
 Ranga The Donga (2010)
 Seema Tapakai (2011)
 Sevakudu (2013)
 Malligadu Marriage Bureau (2014)

Television

 Jabardast (2016)
 Extra Jabardast (2016)

See also
Maayajaalam movie

References

External links

1972 births
Living people
People from Anantapur district
Telugu male actors
Telugu comedians